Courbet is a French surname. Notable people with the surname include:

Amédée Courbet (1828–1885), French admiral
Félicien Courbet (1888–1967), Belgian water polo player and breaststroke swimmer who competed in the 1908 Summer Olympics
Gustave Courbet (1819–1877), French painter 
Julien Courbet (born 1965), French journalist

See also
Curbet
Courbet (disambiguation)

French-language surnames